Haldin is a surname. Notable people with the surname include:

Daphne Haldin (1899–1973), British arts historian
Mats Haldin (born 1975), Finnish orienteering competitor
Misan Haldin (born 1982), German basketball player of Nigerian origin
Thomas Haldin (born 1965), Swedish tennis player